The S-300VM "Antey-2500" (NATO reporting name SA-23 Gladiator/Giant) is a Russian anti-ballistic missile system. The system is designed to target short- and medium-range ballistic missiles, aeroballistic missiles, cruise missiles, fixed-wing aircraft, loitering ECM platforms, and precision-guided munitions.

Structure

Components
The Antey-2500 air defense missile system features:
 Battle performance automation due to high-speed digital computers
 Passive electronically scanned array radars with advanced data processing methods
 High ECM immunity
 High mobility and autonomous operation
 High firepower potential, irrespective of air attack tactics or sequence
 Vertical launch from a special transport launch canister
 Maintenance-free operation of missiles for at least ten years
 Capability to defeat ballistic missile individual warheads
 Inertial guidance with radio command mid-course update and semi-active radar homing at the terminal phase
 Focused detonation of the missile warhead

The Antey-2500 system comprises:
 Command post
 Circular and sector scan radars
 A Multichannel Missile Guidance Station (MMGS) which has 24 channels for illumination of 24 targets
 9A82M launcher (typical amount of 8 missiles) which includes radar of illumination, targeting, and internals of the radar
 9A83M launcher (typical amount of 12 missiles) which includes radar of illumination, targeting, and internals of the radar
 9A84M and 9A85M loader-launcher (technical maximum of 24 missiles)
 9M82M and 9M83M air defense missiles
 Maintenance, repair, and transport of vehicles
 Group SPTA set
 Electronic trainer for MMGS operators
 Set of missile handling equipment

Technical ability to use 1-2 additional battalions.

Missile
The 9M82M missile is intended to defeat tactical, theater, and medium-range ballistic missiles, as well as aerodynamic targets at a range of up to 200 km. The Antey-2500 system is mounted on a tracked cross-country vehicle equipped with self-contained power supply and navigation systems, as well as surveying and positioning equipment.

Variants
S-300V: began operating in 1983; 100 km range
S-300VM: 250 km range
S-300VMD: 350 km range
S-300V4: in service since 2014; ; Antey-4000 are the export version.

Operational history
In early October 2016, a battery of Russian S-300V4 missile system was deployed to Syria, at the Russian naval base in Tartus. In early December 2020, the system entered combat duty on the Kuril Islands.

In 2023 during the Russian invasion of Ukraine at least one S-300V4 system of the Russian Armed Forces was damaged or destroyed by a loitering munition, which of course basically proves that this system is used by the Russian side in this one War.

S-300 system family tree

Operators

Current operators
: ordered more than three S-300V4 divisions by 2015
77th Air defense brigade (Korenovsk) and 988th Air defense Regiment (Gyumri) in the Southern Military District
202nd Air defense brigade (Naro-Fominsk) and 1545th Air defense Regiment (Znamensk) in the Western Military District
1724th Air defense regiment (Birobidzhan and Yuzhno-Sakhalinsk) and air defense unit stationed in the Jewish Autonomous Region in the Eastern Military District
28th Air defense Brigade (Mirny / Kirov oblast) in the Central Military District
Modernization of all S-300V to the version S-300V4 was to end in 2012.
: The S-300VM "Antey-2500" missile system was ordered in 2014, as part of a multi-billion Egyptian-Russian arms deal signed later that year. The $1 billion contract comprises 4 batteries, a command post, and other external elements. In 2015, Russia started delivering the system components, and Egyptian soldiers began their training in Russian training centers. By the end of 2017, all batteries were delivered to Egypt. Russia is in talks with Egypt on the delivery of additional Antey-2500 systems.
: 2 S-300VM in 1 air defense battalion at Base Aérea Militar Capitán Manuel Ríos      
: 6 S-300VM Regiments. 18 Launchers in each regiment. Bought in late 2006.

Potential operators
: In November 2015 Algeria was negotiating the purchase of several battalions of this system.

Failed bids 
: Turkey was in talks with Russian officials for a co-production deal before the Sukhoi Su-24 shootdown incident.
: Russia has offered Saudi Arabia the S-300VM as the first operator.

See also
List of medium-range and long-range SAMs
S-300 missile system
S-350 missile system
S-400 missile system
S-500 missile system
Arrow (Israeli missile)
Medium Extended Air Defense System
Ground-Based Midcourse Defense

References

External links

 S-300VM "Antey-2500" (SA-12 Giant/Gladiator) at the Vestnik PVO website
 S-300VM Antey-2500 SA-23 Gladiator Giant air defense missile system (Army recognition)

Surface-to-air missiles of the Soviet Union
Missile defense
Anti-ballistic missiles of Russia
Surface-to-air missiles of Russia
Almaz-Antey products
Military equipment introduced in the 2010s